Heinrich Eduard Winter (also von Wintter; (1788 in Munich – 11 December 1829 ibid) was a German painter, lithographer and drawing teacher in France and Munich.

Life 
Winter's father, the court and hunting copper engraver Joseph Georg Winter (between 1720 and 1730–1789) died shortly after his birth. His mother subsequently married Johann Michael Mettenleiter, who taught his stepson in such a way that he was soon able to copy some "pictures of the gallery in Munich".

In 1806 - the so-called French period - Winter became professor of draughtsmanship in Sarreguemines, France, but returned to Munich as early as 1809, where he was employed at the Lithographische Anstalt des königlichen Staatsrates founded by Mettenleiter.

Winter had two older siblings. Raphael Winter (born 1784), who became an animal painter and etcher, was his brother.

Work 
Winter contributed the 88 portrait medallions to the work Portraite der berühmtesten Compositeurs der Tonkunst, published between 1813 and 1821 in 22 booklets with texts by Felix Joseph Lipowsky. In 1820 Winter published a Collection of Landscape Drawings for Beginning and More Proficient Students.

References

Further reading
 Georg Kaspar Nagler: Winter (Wintter), Heinrich E. In Neues allgemeines Künstler-Lexicon oder Nachrichten aus dem Leben und den Werken der Maler, Bildhauer, Baumeister, Kupferstecher, Formschneider, Lithographen, Zeichner, Medailleure, Elfenbeinarbeiter, etc. E. A. Fleischmann, Munich 1936 (Unchanged reprint of the 1835-1852 edition), volume 24,  (books.google.de).
 Winter, Heinrich Eduard. In Hans Vollmer (ed.): Allgemeines Lexikon der Bildenden Künstler von der Antike bis zur Gegenwart. Founded by Ulrich Thieme and Felix Becker. Vol. 36: Wilhelmy–Zyzywi. E. A. Seemann, Leipzig 1947, .

External links 

 

19th-century German painters
19th-century German male artists
German lithographers
1788 births
1829 deaths
Artists from Munich